The three species of kākāriki (also spelled kakariki, without the macrons), or New Zealand parakeets, are the most common species of parakeets in the genus Cyanoramphus, family Psittacidae. The birds' Māori name, which is the most commonly used, means "small parrot". The etymology is: from kākā, parrot + riki, small.  The word is also used to refer to the colour green because of the birds' predominantly green plumage. The patches of red on the birds' rumps are, according to legend, the blood of the demigod Tāwhaki.
The three species on mainland New Zealand are the yellow-crowned parakeet (Cyanoramphus auriceps), the red-crowned parakeet, or red-fronted parakeet (C. novaezelandiae), and the critically endangered Malherbe's parakeet or orange-fronted parakeet (not to be confused with Aratinga canicularis a popular aviary bird known as the orange-fronted conure, orange-fronted parakeet or half-moon conure - C. malherbi).

Habitat 

All above subspecies are native to New Zealand, and have become endangered as a result of habitat destruction following human settlement and nest predation by introduced mammals. Scarce on the mainland, kākāriki have survived well on outlying islands.  They are easy to breed, but as with all protected native species in New Zealand, a licence from the Department of Conservation is required to keep them in captivity.

Mitochondrial DNA analysis has indicated that the orange-fronted parakeet is a separate species and not just a colour variation of the yellow-crowned parakeet. The orange-fronted parakeet is highly endangered, with less than 200 individuals remaining in the North Canterbury region of the South Island. Furthermore, Chatham Island's yellow-crowned parakeet and the red-crowned populations of New Caledonia, Norfolk Island, and the subantarctic islands have been determined to be distinct species.

References

Further reading
 Scofield, R. Paul (2005): The supposed Macquarie Island parakeet in the collection of Canterbury Museum. Notornis 52(2): 117–120. PDF fulltext (subscription required)
 Phipps, Graeme (2006): The Kakarikis. The Macleay Museum, The University of Sydney, 2006 Australia  PDF fulltext

External links

NZBirds.com - Kakariki
 The Lexicon of Parrots - Red-fronted Parakeet
Kakariki.net; A Popular and useful resource with forums on kakariki husbandry, breeding and conservation

Cyanoramphus
Birds of New Zealand
Parrots of Oceania
Bird common names